Paradise for Two is a 1937 British musical comedy film directed by Thornton Freeland and starring Jack Hulbert, Patricia Ellis and Arthur Riscoe. It was released in the U.S. with the alternative title Gaiety Girls. A chorus girl is mistaken for a millionaire's girlfriend.

It was a loose remake of the 1933 German film And Who Is Kissing Me?

Cast
 Jack Hulbert as Rene Martin
 Patricia Ellis as Jeannette
 Arthur Riscoe as Jacques Thibaud
 Googie Withers as Miki
 Sydney Fairbrother as Miss Clare
 Wylie Watson as Clarence
 David Tree as Marcel
 Cecil Bevan as Renaud
 H. F. Maltby as Director
 Anthony Holles as Brand
 Roland Culver as Paul Duval
 Finlay Currie as Creditor
 Martita Hunt as Madame Bernard

Production
The film's budget was approximately £80,000. It was made at Denham Studios, with sets designed by Vincent Korda.

Critical reception
Allmovie wrote "British musical-comedy star Jack Hulbert...does not disappoint his fans."

See also
 Happy Go Lovely (1951)

References

Bibliography
 Wood, Linda. British Films 1927-1939. British Film Institute, 1986.

External links

1937 films
1937 musical comedy films
Films directed by Thornton Freeland
1930s English-language films
British musical comedy films
Films produced by Alexander Korda
British remakes of German films
Films shot at Denham Film Studios
British black-and-white films
1930s British films